The subfamily Cacatuinae consists of two tribes, the Microglossini with one species (palm cockatoo) and the Cacatuini with four genera: 

 
Cacatuidae